Akhiyon Se Goli Maare is a 2002 Indian Hindi-language comedy film, directed by Harmesh Malhotra, starring Govinda, Raveena Tandon, Kader Khan, Shakti Kapoor, Asrani and Johnny Lever. The film was released on 2 August 2002. The name of the film is taken from the song of the same name from the 1998 movie Dulhe Raja, also starring the same cast.

Plot
Akelinder or Bhangari Dada has a shop at Chor bazaar which he runs illegally, he lives with his wife and only daughter Kiran. Bhangari wants his daughter to be married to a gangster, so he begins his search. He finds Shakti dada and wants him to be married to Kiran, but Kiran already loves Raj, a wealthy man who has no links to crime. But in order to satisfy her dad, she persuades Raj to pose as a gangster for the time being. For this, they search for a trainer called Subramaniam, who teaches Raj to act as a gangster. Finally Raj becomes successful in posing as a gangster, but Bhangari's dad somehow appears and doesn't want Kiran to marry to a gangster. Will Raj be able to clean up his image?

Cast
Govinda as Raj Oberoi / Bobdeya Dada
Raveena Tandon as Kiran Kapoor (Fake Name) / Kiran Bhangari
Kader Khan as Aklinder "Topichand" Bhangari / Rana Bheeshmbar Pratap Bhangari (Bhangari's father)
Asrani as Topichand's brother-in-law
Johnny Lever as Master Subramaniam
Avtar Gill as Thomson
Dinesh Hingoo as Shaadilal
Razzak Khan as Faiyaz Takkar Pehelwan
Satyen Kappu as Magistrate Kapoor
Shakti Kapoor as Shakti Dada
Tiku Talsania as Mr. Oberoi
Viju Khote as Chorge
Sharat Saxena as Babu Chhapri 
Beena as Mrs. Oberoi
Ghanashyam Rohera as Constable Dhanche
Rana Jung Bahadur as Jerry
Anjana Mumtaz as Sulekha Bhangari
Veeru Krishnan

Soundtrack
Music composed by Anand-Milind, Daboo Malik and Dilip Sen-Sameer Sen.

Box office
The movie was a box-office bomb, collecting only 3.1 crores.

Reception
Sify gave the film a rating of 3 out of 5 calling it "a very average film" with no department of filmmaking standing out, except for some funny dialogues. Taran Adarsh of Bollywood Hungama said, "Harmesh Malhotra's Akhiyon Se Goli Maare falls in the genre of light entertainers", giving it a 1.5 out of 5 stars. The Times of India says, "While provision has to be made for suspension of disbelief in popular entertainment, this one stretches beyond belief and endurance too".

References

External links
 

2002 films
2000s Hindi-language films
Films scored by Anand–Milind
Films scored by Dilip Sen-Sameer Sen
Films scored by Daboo Malik
Films scored by Sanjoy Chowdhury
Films directed by Harmesh Malhotra